The Wrightsman House, at 209 Bauer Ave. in Mancos, Colorado, was built in 1903.  It was listed on the National Register of Historic Places in 1997;  the listing included three contributing buildings.  It has also been known as the Wrightsman Hotel.

It was originally built in 1903 to serve as a residence and hospital, but was serving as a hotel by 1917.  In 1995 it was converted to a bed and breakfast.

It is a large two-and-a-half-story eclectic stone house, amidst a wide area of lawn and mature trees.  The house is built of quarried sandstone from foothills to the southwest of Mancos which were also used in building the Mancos High School (1909).

The property includes a carriage house and a historic privy.

References

External links
Come back to our valley

		
National Register of Historic Places in Montezuma County, Colorado
Victorian architecture in Colorado

Houses completed in 1903